Keeping Up with the Kardashians is an American reality television series that airs on the E! cable network. The show focuses on the personal and professional lives of the Kardashian–Jenner blended family. Its premise originated with Ryan Seacrest, who also serves as an executive producer. The series debuted on October 14, 2007 and has subsequently become one of the longest-running reality television series in the country. The sixteenth season premiered on March 31, 2019.

Cast

Main cast 
 Kim Kardashian 
 Kourtney Kardashian 
 Khloé Kardashian 
 Kendall Jenner 
 Kylie Jenner 
 Kris Jenner 
 Scott Disick 
 Kanye West

Recurring cast 
 MJ Shannon
 Corey Gamble
 Larsa Pippen
 Jonathan Cheban
 Malika Haqq
 Mason Disick
 North West
 Penelope Disick
 Reign Disick

Development and production

On August 24, 2017, it was announced the family had signed a $150 million deal with E!.

On August 20, 2018, Kim Kardashian announced on Twitter that the family will begin filming Season 16 the following week.

Ratings

The 16th season finale of E!’s “Keeping Up With the Kardashians” finished as the show’s most-watched episode in nearly three years.

The episode, which showcased the fallout of the cheating scandal plaguing Khloé Kardashian’s relationship with Tristan Thompson, delivered 2.4 million total viewers with three days of delayed viewing factored in, according to Nielsen. That’s the biggest audience for an episode of “KUWTK” since Season 12.

Overall, the season averaged 1.9 million total viewers, a seven percent increase from last season. Among adult viewers under 50, the season was up five percent overall, at 1.2 million.

Season 16 (2019)

References 

Keeping Up with the Kardashians
2019 American television seasons
Television shows related to the Kardashian–Jenner family